Đắk Mâm is a township and capital of Krông Nô District, Đắk Nông Province, Vietnam.

References

Populated places in Đắk Nông province
District capitals in Vietnam
Townships in Vietnam